Milton Sobel (August 30, 1919 – December 31, 2002) was professor emeritus of statistics at the University of California, Santa Barbara. He made notable contributions in the areas of decision theory, sequential analysis, selection and ranking, reliability analysis, combinatorial problems, and Dirichlet processes. Of particular note are his contributions in selection and ranking, sequential analysis and reliability.

He obtained his B.A. in mathematics (1940) from the City College of New York, M.A. in mathematics (1946) and Ph.D.  in mathematical statistics (advisor: Abraham Wald, 1951) from Columbia University.

During 1960-1975 he was Professor of Statistics at the University of Minnesota.

Books
1985: Selected Tables in Mathematical Statistics: Dirchlet Integrals of Type 2 and Their Applications (with V. R. R. Uppuluri , K. Frankowski)
1977: Selecting and Ordering Populations (with Jean D. Gibbons and Ingram Olkin)
1968: Sequential Identification and Ranking Procedures (with  Robert E. Bechhofer and Jack C. Kiefer)

Honors
Fellow of the Institute of Mathematical Statistics (1956)
Fellow of the American Statistical Association (1958) 
 Guggenheim Fellowship (1967–1968)
 NIH Fellowship (1968–1969)
Elected membership in the International Statistical Institute (1974)

References

1919 births
2002 deaths
University of California, Santa Barbara faculty
University of Minnesota faculty
Columbia University alumni
Fellows of the American Statistical Association
Fellows of the Institute of Mathematical Statistics
Elected Members of the International Statistical Institute
Statistics educators
Jewish American academics
American statisticians
20th-century American Jews
21st-century American Jews